Marko Pavićević (born 3 September 1986) is a Serbian professional footballer who plays as a striker for Canadian Soccer League club Serbian White Eagles FC.

Career

Early career 
After starting out at his hometown club Takovo, Pavićević would spend the next four and a half years with Sevojno, before the club merged into Sloboda Užice in the summer of 2010. Before Sevojno's merger, he played in the 2009–10 UEFA Europa League against FBK Kaunas and Lille. 

In the summer of 2011, he went abroad to play in the Cypriot First Division with Ethnikos Achna. 

After a single season in Cyprus, he returned to Serbia to play with Borac Cacak where he participated in the 2011–12 Serbian Cup final where Borac was defeated by Red Star Belgrade. Following his two-year stint in the Serbian second tier he returned to the Serbian SuperLiga in 2014 to sign with FK Voždovac.

Greece 
In the summer of 2014, Pavićević moved abroad to Greece and would spend the next three and a half years with several different clubs. His first stint was in the Greek second division with Ermionida. In his debut season with Ermionida, he appeared in 29 matches and recorded 15 goals. He would remain in the second tier by signing with Acharnaikos in 2015. After two seasons in the Greek second tier, Pavićević secured a deal with Kavala in the Gamma Ethniki.  

In his short tenure with Kavala, he scored eight goals before his release in the winter of 2016. For the remainder of the 2016-17 season, he played with league rivals Doxa Drama. After the conclusion of the season, he played his final season in Greece with Rodos for the 2017-18 season.

Balkans 
Following his lengthy stay in Greece he returned to his country's top tier in the winter of 2018 to sign with former club Voždovac. In the summer of 2018, he moved to OFK Titograd of the Montenegrin First League. In his debut season in Montenegro, he appeared 34 matches and recorded 11 goals. He received another opportunity in the Serbian SuperLiga the following season with Napredak Kruševac.  

In 2021, he returned to the Serbian second division and secured a deal with FK Kolubara. On 19 August 2021, he signed with OFK Beograd.

Canada 
In the summer of 2022, he signed with the Serbian White Eagles of the Canadian Soccer League. He made his debut for Serbia on July 30, 2022, against BGHC FC where he recorded two goals. He helped the Serbs in securing the regular-season title including a playoff berth. Pavićević played in the second round of the postseason against FC Continentals where the White Eagles were eliminated.

Honours
Sevojno
 Serbian Cup: Runner-up 2008–09

References

External links
 
 
 

1986 births
Living people
Serbia and Montenegro footballers
Serbian expatriate footballers
Association football forwards
Acharnaikos F.C. players
A.E. Ermionida F.C. players
Doxa Drama F.C. players
Ethnikos Achna FC players
FK Borac Čačak players
FK Napredak Kruševac players
FK Sevojno players
FK Sloboda Užice players
FK Takovo players
FK Voždovac players
Kavala F.C. players
OFK Titograd players
People from Gornji Milanovac
Rodos F.C. players
FK Kolubara players
OFK Beograd players 
Serbian White Eagles FC players
Canadian Soccer League (1998–present) players
Cypriot First Division players
Montenegrin First League players
Football League (Greece) players
Serbian First League players
Serbian footballers
Serbian SuperLiga players
Serbian expatriate sportspeople in Cyprus
Serbian expatriate sportspeople in Greece
Serbian expatriate sportspeople in Montenegro
Expatriate footballers in Cyprus
Expatriate footballers in Greece
Expatriate footballers in Montenegro